Fortaleza de Nossa Senhora da Conceição is a fort located in Rio de Janeiro, Brazil.

See also
History of Rio de Janeiro

References

External links

Nossa Senhora
Buildings and structures in Rio de Janeiro (city)
Portuguese colonial architecture in Brazil